

Coombe  is a locality in the Australian state of South Australia located about  south-east of the state capital of Adelaide and about  south-east of the municipal seat in Tailem Bend.

Coombe ’s boundaries were created on 24 August 2000 and given the “local established name” which is derived from the Coombe Railway Station and ultimately from the cadastral unit of the Hundred of Coombe.  Despite its name, the locality consists of land in south-east corner of the Hundred of Coombe in the west and the southern ends of the adjoining hundreds of Archibald and Makin in the east.

The Dukes Highway and Adelaide-Wolseley railway line both pass thought the locality from the town of Tintinara in the north-west to the town of Keithin the south-east.

Land use within the locality is ’primary production’ with exception to some land zoned for conservation on its southern boundary over the area proclaimed as the Kelvin Powrie Conservation Park.

The 2016 Australian census which was conducted in August 2016 reports that Coombe had 64 people living within its boundaries.

Coombe is located within the federal division of Barker, the state electoral district of Mackillop and the local government area of the Coorong District Council.

References

Towns in South Australia